Father Philip Preston (d.1647) was a priest of the Oratory who was confessor to Queen Henrietta Maria. He was a Scot. At the time of the purging of Henrietta Maria's French household in 1626 by her husband, King Charles I, there were three English priests allowed to her, Fathers Potter and Godfrey, and Father Philip Preston, a Scot. Because of his Scottish nationality he was elected to be her Majesty's confessor.

This arrangement proved to be so successful that he remained her confessor until the end of his life, he died in 1647. Henrietta was so much attached to him that she went to see him in his sickness at the Oratorians' House in the Rue S. Honoré.

In the summer of 1641, it was proposed that, in compliance with the request of the prince of Orange, the Queen should attend her daughter, Mary, Princess Royal into Holland, and also use the Spa waters, which were strongly recommended for her own health. The parliament, correctly surmising that there was some secondary motive in the queen's proposed visit, raised objections to her departure. According to a letter sent to Frederick Henry, Prince of Orange:The confessor, Father Philip, was sent to the tower by parliament, for placing improper persons about her, such as her secretary, Sir John Winter ; a letter from him to Montague having been intercepted, in which he said "The Puritans, if they dared, would pull the good queen to pieces; and can the good king of France suffer a daughter of France, his sister, and her children, to be thus affronted?"He must soon have been released, because he was with Queen to Hague, where she went to urge solid assistance from the Prince of Orange and raising money by pawning her own jewels and those of the crown, amongst the rich merchants of Holland.

Father Philip was with the Queen when she fled the English Civil War to her native France in 1644.

References 

1647 deaths
17th-century Scottish people
17th-century English people
17th-century French people
Court of Charles I of England
Household of Henrietta Maria